Marthinus Theunis "Theunie" Steyn SC (5 November 1920 – 14 April 1998) was a South African judge of the Appellate Division and Administrator-General of South West Africa.

Early life and education
Steyn was born on the farm "Onze Rust", which belonged to his grandfather, President MT Steyn, the last president of the Orange Free State, and then to his father, Colin Fraser Steyn, a former Minister of Justice of the Union of South Africa. In 1937, he matriculated at Grey College in Bloemfontein and then went to the University of Cape Town, where he obtained his BA degree in 1940 and his LLB in 1944. During 1944 to 1945. Steyn was a first lieutenant in the infantry of the 6th Armoured Division and fought in Italy during World War II.

Career
On 5 February 1948, Steyn was admitted as an advocate of the High Court of South Africa and immediately began practising as an advocate at the Free State Bar. He became senior counsel in May 1965 and acted as judge of the division several times from 1968. He was permanently appointed judge of the Free State Provincial Division on 1 June 1974.

From September 1977 to August 1978, Steyn served as first Administrator-General of the then South West Africa. It is widely acknowledged that he did good work in preparing for the independence of SWA. In 1987 he was appointed acting appeal judge and on 14 January 1988 as permanent judge of appeal. He continued to serve as an appeal judge until he reached the age of 75.

References

1920 births
1998 deaths
South African judges
20th-century South African judges
Alumni of Grey College, Bloemfontein
University of Cape Town alumni